How Strange to Be Named Federico is a 2013 documentary film directed by Ettore Scola. The film documents the director's relationship with his friend and inspiration, film director Federico Fellini. It begins with the 19-year-old Fellini arriving in Rome and walking into the office of the magazine Marc'Aurelio.

The film premiered out of competition at the 2013 Venice Film Festival.

References

External links

2013 films
2013 documentary films
Italian documentary films
Films directed by Ettore Scola
Works about Federico Fellini
Documentary films about film directors and producers
2010s Italian-language films
2010s Italian films